Crypto-fascism is the secret support for, or admiration of, fascism or trends very closely related to the ideology.  The term is used to imply that an individual or group keeps this support or admiration hidden to avoid political persecution or political suicide.  The common usage is "crypto-fascist", one who practices this support.

Etymology
In an ABC television debate during the chaos of the 1968 Democratic National Convention, after William F. Buckley, Jr. mentions fascism thrice and totalitarianism once in a way that makes it clear that he opposes fascism and totalitarianism and after he mentions Nazism in the same oppositional manner multiple times, Gore Vidal described William F. Buckley, Jr. as a "sort of pro or crypto-Nazi", and would write in an essay published in Esquire in 1969, "I had not intended to use the phrase "pro crypto Nazi." "Fascist-minded" was more my intended meaning". In 2015, NPR misreported that in the debate, Vidal called Buckley Jr. a "crypto-fascist". This may be why Gore Vidal is sometimes cited as using the term "crypto-Fascism".

The term had, in fact, appeared five years earlier in a German-language book by the sociologist Theodor W. Adorno, . Adorno used "crypto-fascism" as early as 1937 in a letter written to Walter Benjamin. In this document, the term is not linked to secret support or admiration of fascism but it is used to refer to someone who is insufficiently conscious when displaying such regressive tendencies.

Usage
The term was used by German Nobel laureate Heinrich Böll in a 1972 essay (titled ) that was sharply critical of the tabloid newspaper 's coverage of the Baader-Meinhof Gang left-wing terrorist organization. In the essay, Böll stated that what  does "is no longer crypto-fascist, no longer fascistoid, that is naked fascism. Incitement, lies, filth."

In an other example, in 2011, writing for the Guardian, Roy Moody suggests that "mainstream Hollywood cinema" and Frank Miller are "crypto-fascist" because they promote the view that "war against a ruthless enemy is good, and military service is good, that killing makes you a man, that capitalism must prevail." He adds that because American films "are more polite about it, lest they should offend," they are "crypto-fascist" as opposed to just fascist. He then adds that according to his feelings, Frank Miller is "somewhere between "propagandistic" and "cryptofascist"" because he is not as secretive about his fascism as the rest of mainstream Hollywood cinema. Earlier in the piece, he writes that Miller had recently published a "diatribe against the Occupy Wall Street movement ("A pack of louts, thieves, and rapists[...] Wake up, pond scum, America is at war against a ruthless enemy")." He adds, "whatever mainstream Hollywood cinema is now, Frank Miller is part of it. And Frank Miller has done Occupy Wall Street a service by reminding us that our allegedly democratic political system, which increases inequality and decreases class mobility, which is mostly interested in keeping the disenfranchised where they are, requires a mindless, propagandistic (or "cryptofascist") storytelling medium to distract its citizenry."

See also 
 Proto-fascism
 Clerical fascism
 Neo-fascism
 Crypto-communism
 Fellow traveller
 Ecofascism

References 

Fascism
Neo-fascism
Political slurs